The Pearl Theatre Company, commonly referred to as the Pearl Theatre, was a theatre in New York City. It was established in Chelsea by Shepard Sobel in 1984, with David Hyde Pierce part of the company's first season. The company focused on producing classic works performed by their resident acting company. After moving to St Mark's Place and then to City Center, the company moved in 2012 into their first permanent home, a 160-seat theatre at 555 West 42nd Street between Tenth and Eleventh Avenue in Hell's Kitchen, Manhattan.

After 33 seasons, the company closed in June 2017, filing for bankruptcy. Members of the company then formed The Resident Acting Company, performing a similar repertory program at the Players Club in Gramercy Park South.

References

External links
 
The Pearl Theatre Company at the Internet off-Broadway Database (incomplete)

Off-Broadway theaters
1984 establishments in New York City
2017 disestablishments in New York (state)
Hell's Kitchen, Manhattan
42nd Street (Manhattan)